Sport on Five may refer to:
5 live Sport - BBC Radio 5 programme, formerly Sport on 5
Channel 5 (UK)